Ashing or Aashing is an unclassified Sino-Tibetan language, probably of the Tani branch, spoken at the headwaters of the Siang River in Northeastern India near the Tibetan border, from Ramsing in the south to Tuting in the north. The most populous Ashing settlements are Pango and Bomdo.

References

Tani languages
Languages of Assam
Unclassified languages of Asia

External links